Mercedes Palomino CM CQ, (February 2, 1913 – April 18, 2006) was a Spanish-born Quebec actor and theatre director.

Biography
She was born in Barcelona and moved to Argentina with her family at the age of five. Palomino studied at the National Conservatory of Dramatic Arts there, She went on to a career as a journalist and on radio. During the 1940s, she worked as an actor in Chile. She next worked as head of the theatre section of Radio-Lima. Palomino worked for CBS in New York City in 1946. In 1948, Palomino came to Montreal on assignment. Later that same year, with Yvette Brind'Amour, she founded the Théâtre du Rideau Vert. From 1953 to 1965, she was producer of Spanish services at Radio Canada International.

Palomino was awarded the Order of Canada in 1983. From 1969 to 1982, she served on the board of governors for the National Theatre School of Canada. From 1971 to 1985, she was president of the Association des Directeurs de Théâtre and, from 1986 to 2003, she was president of the Théâtres associés.

References

1913 births
2006 deaths
Knights of the National Order of Quebec
Members of the Order of Canada
Canadian stage actresses
Actresses from Barcelona
Spanish emigrants to Canada
20th-century Canadian actresses